is a 1978 Japanese television series. It is the 16th NHK taiga drama, and is based on Saburo Shiroyama's novel of the same title. The series is the first taiga drama to focus on the lives of commoners and merchants, and the first taiga drama to be filmed outside Japan.

Plot
It depicts the lives of merchants and people of Sakai city in the Sengoku period.

Cast

The People of Sakai
Ichikawa Somegorō VI as Luzon Sukezaemon
Komaki Kurihara as Mio
Jinpachi Nezu as Ishikawa Goemon
Kōji Tsuruta as Sen no Rikyū
Tetsurō Tamba as Imai Sōkyū
Ryūzō Hayashi as Imai Sōkun
Masahiko Tsugawa as Tsuda Sōgyū

People of Toyotomi clan
Ken Ogata as Toyotomi Hideyoshi
Yukiyo Toake as Nene
Shiho Fujimura as Yodo-dono
Masaomi Kondō as Ishida Mitsunari
Akira Onodera as Konishi Yukinaga
Nobuyuki Katsube as Kuroda Kanbei

People of Oda clan
Kōji Takahashi as Oda Nobunaga
Taketoshi Naito as Akechi Mitsuhide

People of Hosokawa clan
Yoko Shimada as Hosokawa Gracia

People of Tokugawa clan
Kiyoshi Kodama as Tokugawa Ieyasu
 Jirō Yabuki as Hattori Hanzō

People of Mōri clan
Shigeru Kōyama as Ankokuji Ekei

Others
Noboru Matsuhashi as Ashikaga Yoshiaki
Vic Vargas
Matsumoto Kōshirō VIII as Jinbei, Sukezaemon's father
Terumasa Fujima as Sukeza

References

Taiga drama
1978 Japanese television series debuts
1970s drama television series
Cultural depictions of Oda Nobunaga
Cultural depictions of Tokugawa Ieyasu
Cultural depictions of Toyotomi Hideyoshi
Cultural depictions of Akechi Mitsuhide
Jidaigeki television series